The 1979 Pacific typhoon season featured the largest and most intense tropical cyclone recorded globally, Typhoon Tip. The season also experienced slightly above-average tropical cyclone activity. The season had no official bounds; it ran year-round in 1979, but most tropical cyclones tend to form in the northwestern Pacific Ocean between June and December. These dates conventionally delimit the period of each year when most tropical cyclones form in the northwestern Pacific Ocean.

The scope of this article is limited to the Pacific Ocean, north of the equator and west of the international date line. Storms that form east of the date line and north of the equator are called hurricanes; see 1979 Pacific hurricane season. Tropical storms formed in the entire west Pacific basin were assigned a name by the Joint Typhoon Warning Center. Tropical depressions in this basin have the "W" suffix added to their number. Tropical depressions that enter or form in the Philippine area of responsibility are assigned a name by the Philippine Atmospheric, Geophysical and Astronomical Services Administration or PAGASA. This can often result in the same storm having two names.

Seasonal summary 

54 tropical depressions formed this year in the Western Pacific, of which 24 became tropical storms. 13 storms reached typhoon intensity, of which 4 reached super typhoon strength.

Systems

Typhoon Alice 

On December 31, a tropical depression developed over the low latitudes of the open West Pacific. It tracked northwestward, reaching tropical storm strength that night and typhoon strength on the 5th. Alice turned to the west, and continued to intensify with generally favorable conditions to a peak of 125 mph winds on the 8th. Cooler, drier air to the north caused Alice to weaken to a minimal typhoon, but as the typhoon turned to the northwest it briefly re-strengthened to a 115 mph typhoon on January 11. Upper-level winds, combined with the dry air, weakened Alice for good, causing it to dissipate on the 14th after stalling for three days. Alice caused extensive damage in the Marshall Islands.

Typhoon Bess (Auring) 

Typhoon Bess was the third typhoon since 1959 to develop in the month of March. Bess began as a weak surface circulation on March 16. The circulation intensified into a tropical depression on March 19. Bess then reached tropical storm strength on March 21. Slow intensification occurred for 18 hours, before Bess reached its peak intensity of  early on March 23. Bess held on to its peak intensity for 18 hours before vertical wind shear caused Bess to rapidly dissipate on March 25. Typhoon Bess remained away from land, and therefore caused no deaths or damage.

Typhoon Cecil (Bebeng) 

Typhoon Cecil formed on the 10th from an easterly wave in early April. The storm then reached its maximum intensity as a category 1 typhoon on the 14th. Typhoon Cecil then dissipated on April 20. Typhoon Cecil stuck Leyte on April 15, causing 18 deaths, damage of $10 million and leaving 8,900 homeless. Cecil was also the first tropical cyclone in the Western Pacific to be given a male name.

Tropical Storm Dot (Karing) 

A tropical disturbance developed on May 6. By May 10, the disturbance was upgraded to a tropical depression. It then was upgraded to a tropical storm on May 11. Dot then reached its peak intensity as a weak tropical storm the next day. Dot was downgraded to a tropical depression late on the 14th. The storm dissipated on May 17.

Tropical Storm 05W (Diding) 

Initially, TD 05 drifted southwestward east of the Paracel Islands. TD 05 was not forecast to intensify significantly, but it merged with an extratropical frontal boundary near 22.N 124.8E and produced an improved satellite signature which included a banding-type eye.

Typhoon Ellis (Etang) 

A tropical disturbance was first noted on satellite and synoptic data on June 25. The disturbance was upgraded to a tropical depression about 670 nautical miles east of Manila on July 1. It rapidly intensified into a tropical storm and moved west-northwest. Ellis was in a favorable position at that time and steady intensification occurred over the next 2 days. Ellis intensified into a typhoon on July 2 and reached its peak intensity of 100 mph on later that day. Continued intensification was anticipated at that time, but a slow weakening trend was actually observed. The storm passed close to the northern tip of Luzon on July 4 and caused damage to tobacco-rich regions of the Philippines. Ellis then entered the South China Sea and weakened to a severe tropical storm while still moving west-northwest. Ellis made landfall on the Chinese coast on July 6 about 164 nautical miles southwest of Hong Kong and dissipated rapidly over land thereafter. Damage caused by Ellis in Hong Kong was minimal.

Severe Tropical Storm Faye (Gening) 

The associated convective activity remained disorganized until July 1. A few hours later, the disturbance intensified into a tropical depression. On July 3, it was upgraded to a tropical storm and was named Faye. Faye was forecast to reach typhoon status in the next 18 hours. However, Faye weakened. Faye was then downgraded to a tropical depression on July 4. Faye then dissipated on July 7 at 17N, 129.60E.

Tropical Depression 08W 
 A storm that tracked into open waters.

Super Typhoon Hope (Ising) 

A tropical depression formed southeast of Guam on July 24. It headed to the west-northwest, but upper-level shear from the TUTT caused the depression to dissipate on the 27th. It turned northward then westward, where it regenerated on the 28th. Intensification became more steady, with the depression reaching storm strength on the 28th and typhoon strength on the 29th. On the 31st, Hope reached a peak of 150 mph, but land interaction with Taiwan to the north weakened the storm. On August 2, Typhoon Hope struck southern China, about 10 miles east of Hong Kong. It weakened over the country while moving westward, but retained its satellite signature. Upon reaching the Bay of Bengal on the 7th, Hope restrengthened to a tropical storm, but moved over India and dissipated on the 8th. In Guangdong Province in China, the typhoon was responsible for around 100 deaths or missing people. Twelve people died along with 260 injured in Hong Kong. Hope was the strongest tropical cyclone to hit Hong Kong since Typhoon Rose in 1971.

Severe Tropical Storm Gordon (Herming) 

Gordon brushed southern Taiwan.

Tropical Depression 11W (Luding) 

11W was tracked by PAGASA.

Typhoon Irving (Mameng) 

The monsoon trough spawned a tropical depression on August 7 to the east of the Philippines. It tracked to the north then to the west. Steering currents weakened, causing the depression to loop to the north. It was able to strengthen there, reaching tropical storm status on the 11th and typhoon status on the 13th. Irving continued to the north, attaining a peak of 100 mph winds on the 15th. Its broad, loose wind field prevented it from strengthening further, and Irving weakened as it continued northward. On the 17th, Irving hit southwest South Korea as a minimal typhoon, and merged with a frontal boundary over extreme eastern Russia on the 18th. Torrential rains led to 150 fatalities, with damage at $10–$20 million (1979 USD).

Super Typhoon Judy (Neneng) 

A tropical disturbance organized into a tropical storm on August 15. It tracked to the northwest, becoming a tropical storm on the 17th. Judy rapidly intensified, reaching typhoon status on the 18th and a peak of 155 mph winds on the 20th. The super typhoon began to weaken as it passed south of Okinawa, and neared the Chinese coast on the 23rd and 24th. Judy turned to the northeast, and brushed past South Korea as a tropical depression on the 26th, shortly before dissipating. Judy passed through Guam and other Pacific islands, but damage was reported light there. However, the storm brought heavy rain to Korea as a tropical depression, killing 111 and causing more damage to an area hit by Irving just weeks before.

Tropical Depression 14W 

14W lasted three days from August 18–20 producing only minimal winds.

Tropical Storm Ken (Oniang) 

A tropical disturbance developed on August 30 and became a tropical depression later that day. The depression was upgraded to a tropical storm and was named Ken. The storm moved north and turned north-northeast, striking Shikoku late on the 3rd. Ken weakened over Japan and dissipated on September 4.

Typhoon Lola 

Around the same time the precursor to Tropical Storm Ken developed, a tropical disturbance developed south of Marcus Island. The disturbance became a tropical depression on the 2nd and a tropical storm on the 4th. Lola was upgraded to a typhoon early on September 5. Lola weakened to a tropical storm on the 7th. The next day, Lola weakened to a tropical depression at 35.90N, 151.80E. Lola then transitioned into an extratropical cyclone on September 9 to the east of Japan.

Severe Tropical Storm Mac (Pepang) 

A weak surface circulation formed northeast of Yap on September 12, tracking westward. On September 16, the circulation gained tropical storm intensity and was named Mac. Mac attained peak intensity before making landfall in the Philippines, causing the storm to weaken. Frictional effects caused the storm to weaken over southern Luzon. Due to Tropical Storm Nancy's development, Mac's track was influenced into the South China Sea. Mac made landfall near Hong Kong and dissipated on September 24.

Tropical Storm Nancy 

On September 17, a tropical disturbance rapidly developed into a tropical storm and was given the name Nancy. Weak steering currents allowed Nancy to track across the southern portion of Hainan and do a cyclonic loop. The weak currents allowed Nancy to make landfall in Vietnam before dissipating on September 22.

Typhoon Owen (Rosing) 

A tropical disturbance developed south of Guam during September 19. The disturbance was upgraded to a tropical depression on September 22. It then was upgraded to a tropical storm the next day. Owen was upgraded to a typhoon on the 25th. Owen then started to weaken as the storm moved northward. By the 30th, Owen made landfall near Osaka, Japan and weakened to a tropical storm. Owen then transitioned into an extratropical cyclone on October 1. In Japan, Owen killed 12 people and injured another 83.

Tropical Storm Pamela 

Developing at the apex of a wave in the easterly flow in late September 1979, Tropical Storm Pamela formed on September 23 and dissipated on September 26, due to strong shear caused by the nearby Typhoon Owen.

Typhoon Sarah (Sisang-Uring) 

The monsoon trough spawned a disturbance in the eastern Vietnamese Sea on September 30, which developed into Tropical Depression Sisang on October 1. It drifted eastward into Luzon, and looped to the southwest, where it strengthened into a tropical storm, with the JTWC naming the storm Sarah on October 4. Around this time, the PAGASA renamed the system as Uring. Sarah, with weak steering currents, drifted to the south, becoming a typhoon on October 7, before making landfall on Palawan Island. The storm turned to the west, peaking with 130 mph winds on October 10, before the mid-level circulation became decoupled from the low-level circulation. Sarah weakened, and hit eastern Vietnam on October 14 as a 60 mph tropical storm. The storm brought heavy flooding and wind, causing massive crop damage and loss of life. Sarah then weakened to a low-pressure area on October 15, but its remnants turned eastward towards Manila, Philippines, before curving westward towards Vietnam again. The storm's remnants fully dissipated on October 23.

Tropical Storm Roger (Trining) 

Convective activity increased in the monsoon trough that extended over the Caroline Islands on September 28. Post-analysis indicated the existence of a weak circulation southwest of Guam around that time, which was to become Tropical Storm Roger. On October 3, the system organized into Tropical Depression 21W, which was subsequently upgraded to a tropical storm and named Roger on October 4. Strong flow from the equator was drawn into Roger's circulation, preventing development to a disturbance to the east which would become Typhoon Tip. A strong mid-level southeasterly steering current caused Roger to move northwest. Roger then executed a cyclonic loop on October 5. The storm continued to move northwest until north of the ridge axis, after which it turned in a north-northeastward direction. Roger then became an extratropical cyclone on October 7, as it merged with a cold front south of Japan.

Super Typhoon Tip (Warling) 

The cyclone formed on October 5, and after moving into a very favorable environment for development, quickly strengthened into Super Typhoon Tip on the 11th. On the 12th, Super Typhoon Tip continued to intensify, with winds at 190 miles per hour and central pressure at 870 millibars, the lowest barometric pressure ever recorded from a tropical cyclone. Tip ultimately hit Japan, causing 68 deaths and moderate damage. The storm became extratropical on October 19, and was last tracked to a point near the Alaskan Aleutian Islands.
Tip may have made landfall as an extratropical cyclone near Cold Bay, in Alaska.

Super Typhoon Vera (Yayang) 

Vera began as a tropical disturbance in the near equatorial trough on October 27. The disturbance rapidly intensified into a tropical storm and was named Vera on November 2. Vera continued to intensify and reached typhoon strength on November 3. The storm rapidly intensified, reaching its peak intensity as a super typhoon with  winds on November 4. Reconnaissance aircraft indicated that Vera maintained its peak strength for 24 hours before weakening as it approached Catanduanes Island. The next day, Vera weakened to a category 4 storm with  winds. The Philippines began restricting low-level inflow as Vera continued northwestward toward northern Luzon. Shortly after making landfall, an enhanced low-level northeasterly flow over the Taiwan Strait coupled with strong upper-level southwesterlies over the Philippines resulted in the storm's weakening. After moving into the South China Sea, the strong northeast monsoon flow accelerated Vera southwestward and Vera dissipated at 12:00 UTC November 7.

Severe Tropical Storm Wayne (Ading) 

A mid-level circulation was detected on satellite imagery in early November. Wayne moved to the north initially and began to develop more definitive surface circulation on November 7. Wayne turned to the west, tracking toward the central Philippines on November 11. Wayne dissipated as it made landfall in Luzon on November 13.

Tropical Depression 26W 

Tropical Depression 26W did not last long. It was short-lived over the Eastern Pacific, impacting no major land masses and causing no damage.

Typhoon Abby (Barang) 

A tropical disturbance developed over the Marshall Islands on November 29. The disturbance then intensified into Tropical Depression 27W on December 1. 27W then intensified into a tropical storm and was named Abby. The storm moved west and turned to the northwest, while reducing its forward movement on December 3. The JTWC predicted intensification as the storm moved towards Guam. However, Abby weakened to a tropical depression on the 6th as it moved west of Truk. On December 7, Abby reintensified into a weak tropical storm. On the 8th, Abby weakened once again to a tropical depression and accelerated forward. By December 9, aircraft reconnaissance indicated that Abby had two centers of circulation. On the 10th, Abby attained typhoon strength which made it the last typhoon of 1979. On the next day, Abby recurved in response to a mid-tropospheric short-wave trough. As Abby continued to move east-northeast, it rapidly weakened due to strong westerlies. Typhoon Abby then dissipated on December 14 due to strong shear.

Tropical Storm Ben (Krising) 

A tropical depression developed on December 20. Later that day, the depression was upgraded to a tropical storm. The storm was downgraded to a tropical depression on the 23rd and dissipated later that day. Ben was the last tropical cyclone of the 1979 Pacific typhoon season.

Storm names

International 

During the season 23 named tropical cyclones developed in the Western Pacific and were named by the Joint Typhoon Warning Center, when it was determined that they had become tropical storms. These names were contributed to a revised list starting this year, which now includes both female and male names.

Philippines 

The Philippine Atmospheric, Geophysical and Astronomical Services Administration uses its own naming scheme for tropical cyclones in their area of responsibility. PAGASA assigns names to tropical depressions that form within their area of responsibility and any tropical cyclone that might move into their area of responsibility. Should the list of names for a given year prove to be insufficient, names are taken from an auxiliary list, the first 6 of which are published each year before the season starts. Names not retired from this list will be used again in the 1983 season. This is the same list used for the 1975 season. PAGASA uses its own naming scheme that starts in the Filipino alphabet, with names of Filipino female names ending with "ng" (A, B, K, D, etc.).

Retirement 
Naming storms using both female and male names are supposed to be used alternatively. Because Alice is a female name followed by Bess with the same gender, the JTWC retired the name Alice and replaced it with Andy, a male name, which was first used in the 1982 season.

Season effects 
This is a table of all of the storms that have formed in the 1979 Pacific typhoon season. It includes their duration, names, affected areas, damages, and death totals. Deaths in parentheses are additional and indirect (an example of an indirect death would be a traffic accident), but were still related to that storm. Damage and deaths include totals while the storm was extratropical, a wave, or a low, and all of the damage figures are in 1979 USD. Names listed in parentheses were assigned by PAGASA.

|-
| Alice ||  || bgcolor=#| || bgcolor=#| || bgcolor=#| || ||  || ||
|-
| Bess (Auring) ||  || bgcolor=#| || bgcolor=#| || bgcolor=#| || ||  || ||
|-
| Cecil (Bebeng) ||  || bgcolor=#| || bgcolor=#| || bgcolor=#| || ||  || ||
|-
| Dot (Karing) ||  || bgcolor=#| || bgcolor=#| || bgcolor=#| || ||  || ||
|-
| 7905 ||  || bgcolor=#| || bgcolor=#| || bgcolor=#| || ||  || ||
|-
| TD ||  || bgcolor=#| || bgcolor=#| || bgcolor=#| || ||  || ||
|-
| TD ||  || bgcolor=#| || bgcolor=#| || bgcolor=#| || ||  || ||
|-
| Ellis (Etang) ||  || bgcolor=#| || bgcolor=#| || bgcolor=#| || ||  || ||
|-
| Faye (Gening) ||  || bgcolor=#| || bgcolor=#| || bgcolor=#| || ||  || ||
|-
| TD ||  || bgcolor=#| || bgcolor=#| || bgcolor=#| || ||  || ||
|-
| Gordon (Herming) ||  || bgcolor=#| || bgcolor=#| || bgcolor=#| || ||  || ||
|-
| Hope (Ising) ||  || bgcolor=#| || bgcolor=#| || bgcolor=#| || ||  || ||
|-
| TD ||  || bgcolor=#| || bgcolor=#| || bgcolor=#| || ||  || ||
|-
| TD ||  || bgcolor=#| || bgcolor=#| || bgcolor=#| || ||  || ||
|-
| TD ||  || bgcolor=#| || bgcolor=#| || bgcolor=#| || ||  || ||
|-
| TD ||  || bgcolor=#| || bgcolor=#| || bgcolor=#| || ||  || ||
|-
| Irving (Mameng) ||  || bgcolor=#| || bgcolor=#| || bgcolor=#| || ||  || ||
|-
| TD ||  || bgcolor=#| || bgcolor=#| || bgcolor=#| || ||  || ||
|-
| TD ||  || bgcolor=#| || bgcolor=#| || bgcolor=#| || ||  || ||
|-
| TD ||  || bgcolor=#| || bgcolor=#| || bgcolor=#| || ||  || ||
|-
| Judy (Neneng) ||  || bgcolor=#| || bgcolor=#| || bgcolor=#| || ||  || ||
|-
| TD ||  || bgcolor=#| || bgcolor=#| || bgcolor=#| || ||  || ||
|-
| TD ||  || bgcolor=#| || bgcolor=#| || bgcolor=#| || ||  || ||
|-
| TD ||  || bgcolor=#| || bgcolor=#| || bgcolor=#| || ||  || ||
|-
| TD ||  || bgcolor=#| || bgcolor=#| || bgcolor=#| || ||  || ||
|-
| TD ||  || bgcolor=#| || bgcolor=#| || bgcolor=#| || ||  || ||
|-
| TD ||  || bgcolor=#| || bgcolor=#| || bgcolor=#| || ||  || ||
|-
| Ken (Oniang) ||  || bgcolor=#| || bgcolor=#| || bgcolor=#| || ||  || ||
|-
| TD ||  || bgcolor=#| || bgcolor=#| || bgcolor=#| || ||  || ||
|-
| Lola ||  || bgcolor=#| || bgcolor=#| || bgcolor=#| || ||  || ||
|-
| TD ||  || bgcolor=#| || bgcolor=#| || bgcolor=#| || ||  || ||
|-
| Mac (Pepang) ||  || bgcolor=#| || bgcolor=#| || bgcolor=#| || ||  || ||
|-
| TD ||  || bgcolor=#| || bgcolor=#| || bgcolor=#| || ||  || ||
|-
| Nancy ||  || bgcolor=#| || bgcolor=#| || bgcolor=#| || ||  || ||
|-
| TD ||  || bgcolor=#| || bgcolor=#| || bgcolor=#| || ||  || ||
|-
| Owen (Rosing) ||  || bgcolor=#| || bgcolor=#| || bgcolor=#| || ||  || ||
|-
| Pamela ||  || bgcolor=#| || bgcolor=#| || bgcolor=#| || ||  || ||
|-
| TD ||  || bgcolor=#| || bgcolor=#| || bgcolor=#| || ||  || ||
|-
| TD ||  || bgcolor=#| || bgcolor=#| || bgcolor=#| || ||  || ||
|-
| TD ||  || bgcolor=#| || bgcolor=#| || bgcolor=#| || ||  || ||
|-
| Sarah (Sisang-Uring) ||  || bgcolor=#| || bgcolor=#| || bgcolor=#| || ||  || ||
|-
| TD ||  || bgcolor=#| || bgcolor=#| || bgcolor=#| || ||  || ||
|-
| Roger (Trining) ||  || bgcolor=#| || bgcolor=#| || bgcolor=#| || ||  || ||
|-
| Tip (Warling) ||  || bgcolor=#| || bgcolor=#| || bgcolor=#| || ||  || 99 ||
|-
| TD ||  || bgcolor=#| || bgcolor=#| || bgcolor=#| || ||  || ||
|-
| TD ||  || bgcolor=#| || bgcolor=#| || bgcolor=#| || ||  || ||
|-
| TD ||  || bgcolor=#| || bgcolor=#| || bgcolor=#| || ||  || ||
|-
| TD ||  || bgcolor=#| || bgcolor=#| || bgcolor=#| || ||  || ||
|-
| Vera (Yayang) ||  || bgcolor=#| || bgcolor=#| || bgcolor=#| || ||  || ||
|-
| Wayne (Ading) ||  || bgcolor=#| || bgcolor=#| || bgcolor=#| || ||  || ||
|-
| TD ||  || bgcolor=#| || bgcolor=#| || bgcolor=#| || ||  || ||
|-
| TD ||  || bgcolor=#| || bgcolor=#| || bgcolor=#| || ||  || ||
|-
| TD ||  || bgcolor=#| || bgcolor=#| || bgcolor=#| || ||  || ||
|-
| Abby (Barang) ||  || bgcolor=#| || bgcolor=#| || bgcolor=#| || ||  || ||
|-
| Ben (Krising) ||  || bgcolor=#| || bgcolor=#| || bgcolor=#| || ||  || ||
|-

See also 

 Australian region cyclone seasons: 1978–79, 1979–80
 South Pacific cyclone seasons: 1978–79, 1979–80
 South-West Indian Ocean cyclone seasons 1978–79, 1979–80
 1979 Atlantic hurricane season
 1979 Pacific hurricane season
 Pacific typhoon climatology
 1979 North Indian Ocean cyclone season

Notes

References

External links 
 Japan Meteorological Agency
 Joint Typhoon Warning Center .
 China Meteorological Agency
 National Weather Service Guam
 Hong Kong Observatory
 Macau Meteorological Geophysical Services
 Korea Meteorological Agency
 Philippine Atmospheric, Geophysical and Astronomical Services Administration
 Taiwan Central Weather Bureau
 Satellite movie of 1979 Pacific typhoon season